Sigurd Pedersen (26 January 1893 – 16 July 1968) was a Norwegian politician for the Labour Party.

He was born in Espa.

He was elected to the Norwegian Parliament from the Market towns of Hedmark and Oppland counties in 1950, and was re-elected on two occasions. He had previously served in the position of deputy representative during the terms 1928–1930 and 1934–1936.

Pedersen was a member of Vang municipality council in 1925. He then held various positions in Hamar city council, serving as mayor in 1933 and 1934–1935. In 1935 he became burgomaster of Hamar, a position which was later renamed to rådmann, which he held to 1963.

External links

1893 births
1968 deaths
Members of the Storting
Labour Party (Norway) politicians
Mayors of places in Hedmark
Politicians from Hamar
20th-century Norwegian politicians